Miss Spain 2014 may refer to these events:
Miss Universe Spain 2014, Miss Spain 2014 for Miss Universe 2014
Miss World Spain 2014, Miss Spain 2014 for Miss World 2014